Pseudocandona is a genus of ostracods in the family Candonidae, containing the following species:
Pseudocandona agostinhoi Higuti & Martens, 2014
Pseudocandona atmeta Smith & Kamiya, 2015
Pseudocandona cillisi Higuti & Martens, 2014
Pseudocandona claudinae Higuti & Martens, 2014

References

Ostracods